Michael Thomas Gruber (born November 1, 1964) is an American actor. He was born in Cincinnati, Ohio, the youngest of four children, two sisters and one brother.  At an early age, Michael showed great interest in gymnastics and diving.  He became the 2nd best diver in his age class in the world at the age of fourteen.

Michael was an All-American diver who graduated from Indian Hill High School in 1982 and attended the University of Michigan on an athletic scholarship as an Olympic diving hopeful training under then Olympic coach Dick Kimball.

His passion was acting and he decided to study theatre at the University of Cincinnati College-Conservatory of Music.  He made his Broadway debut in the final company of A Chorus Line, 1989-90.

Michael is a composer and co-lyricist, with long-time collaborator Jennifer Allen, of three musicals: The Old Dead Five, Vegas Organic and Hit It, Mike!.  He has also composed music for poems, currently working on a series set to children's poetry.

Michael has performed the roles of Munkustrap both on Broadway and in the Cats video. He quotes regarding the Cats video, "It is sort of the signature of my career."

Broadway credits
A Chorus Line revival  2007
Laughing Room Only   2003 
Kiss Me, Kate  Hortensio 2001 
Swing! Original cast member  1999-2000 
CATS Munkustrap 1996-1999, periodically left to do other shows
My Favorite Year Original Company Ensemble 1992-1993 
Miss Saigon Original cast member. Periodically left to do other shows Ensemble 1991-1994 
A Chorus Line Final Company Mike 1989-1990

National tours
West Side Story US and European Tours Riff US tour 1990 
A Chorus Line 2008 National tour - Zach

Off-Broadway shows
The Wizard of Oz The Theatre at Madison Square Garden The Tin Man/Hickory 1997

Regional shows
Footloose - Chanhassen Dinner Theatres, Chanhassen, MN - Michael Brindisi - 2021-2023Irving Berlin's Easter Parade - Chanhassen Theatres, Chanhassen, MN - Don Hewes - World Premiere - 2007
Irving Berlin's White Christmas - 5th Avenue Theatre, Seattle and California Musical Theatre, Sacramento and The Hobby Center, Houston - Bob Wallace - 2006-2008
My One and Only - Reprise!, Los Angeles - Billy Buck - 2006
Godspell - Walnut Street Theatre, Philadelphia - Jesus - 2006
Singin' in the Rain - 5th Avenue Theatre, Seattle - Don Lockwood - 2005 
Singin' in the Rain - California Musical Theatre, Sacramento - Don Lockwood - 2005 
What a Glorious Feeling - Saugatuck, MI - Stanley Donen - 2005 - World Premier 
White Christmas - Wang Theatre, Boston - Phil Davis - 2005 
Anything Goes Stratford Festival of Canada Billy Crocker 2004 
Singin' in the Rain Houston's Theatre Under The Stars Don Lockwood 2004 
Crazy For You PCPA-CA Bobby Child 2003 
Anything Goes FL Billy Crocker 2003 
Dames at Sea  Goodspeed Opera House-CT Lucky 2002 
Smokey Joe's Cafe  Sacramento, CA  2002 
Red Hot and Blue  Paper Mill Playhouse Fingers 2001 
Singin' in the Rain Music Theatre of Wichita (KS) Don Lockwood 2000 
Anything Goes 5th Avenue Theatre-Seattle Billy Crocker 2000 
The Who's Tommy  DE, CT, MA, IL Cousin Kevin 1999 
Follies  Papermill Playhouse Young Ben 1998 
Oklahoma!  Phoenix & Tucson, AZ Jud Fry 1995 
Kiss Me, Kate  Goodspeed Opera House-CT Bill/Lucentio 1994 
West Side Story
Singin' in the Rain  Papermill Playhouse Don Lockwood 1994 
Music Theatre of Wichita Riff 1994 
Good News!  Music Theatre of Wichita (KS) Tom Marlowe 1993 
Falsettos  Alliance Theatre-Atlanta, GA Whizzer 1993 
Singin' in the Rain  Sacramento, CA Don Lockwood 1993 
Anything Goes  Music Theatre of Wichita (KS) Billy Crocker 1993 
Singin' in the Rain  Music Theatre of Wichita (KS) Don Lockwood 1992 
Readings / Workshops:
Taboo  2003 
Sammy Cahn  2003

Films
Cats Munkustrap Filmed 1997, released 1998

Recordings
Singin' in the Rain Jay Records
Follies TVT Soundtrax
The Most Happy Fella Jay Records
My Favorite Year BMG Classics
Good News! Jay Records
Swing! Sony Classics
Wonderful Town Jay Records -
Carols For A Cure 2001 (BC/EFA) Rock-It Science Records

For complete and accurate information visit Michael's official website

External links

American male musical theatre actors
1964 births
Living people
University of Michigan alumni
Male actors from Cincinnati
University of Cincinnati – College-Conservatory of Music alumni